Gymshark is a British fitness apparel and accessories brand, manufacturer and retailer headquartered in Solihull, England. Founded in June 2012, Gymshark creates and distributes its own range of fitness wear.

In 2020, the company was valued at over £1 billion. Ben Francis is the majority owner of the company. In October 2022, it opened its first retail store, on London's Regent Street.

History

2012–2015: Early history 
Gymshark was founded by school friends Ben Francis and Lewis Morgan in 2012. Both aged 20, they set up the brand while studying at university. Francis studied at Aston University before dropping out, and worked as a delivery driver for Pizza Hut when he first established the company.

Gymshark started drop shipping bodybuilding supplements through its website. In 2013, it began designing and manufacturing its own fitness apparel.

Initially, Francis manufactured the garments in his parents' garage on a made-to-sell basis using a sewing machine and screen printer he purchased with £1,000 of savings. During the first year, Gymshark made £500 in sales per day.

In 2013, the company exhibited at the BodyPower fitness trade show at the NEC arena in Birmingham where it sold out of all its stock in the first day. After the show, Gymshark's Luxe tracksuit went viral on Facebook, generating £30,000 of sales within 30 minutes.

When the company's revenue reached £250,000, Francis and Morgan both left university to focus on Gymshark full time.

In 2016, Morgan partially exited the business retaining 20% of the company, to focus on his other ventures, property development company Ernest Cole and fashion label Maniere De Voir.

2016–present: Expansion 
In 2016, Gymshark was named the UK's fastest growing company in The Sunday Times Fast Track 100.

In 2018, Gymshark moved from its office in Redditch to a new 42,000 square foot headquarters on Blythe Valley Business Park. In the same year, Gymshark made sales of £100 million.

In 2019, the company opened a new 8,000 square foot office in Hong Kong. In September that year, Gymshark launched the Gymshark Lifting Club, a gym and innovation hub, on the same site as its headquarters in Birmingham.

In August 2020, US private equity firm General Atlantic purchased a 21% stake in the company which valued the company in excess of £1 billion. The company said it would use the funding to further expand globally.

In November 2021, Gymshark appointed Gary Vaynerchuk as an advisor to the company's board.

Current operations 
Gymshark's products are sold directly to consumers in 180 countries via websites in 13 languages. The company employs 499 people globally.

In 2019, Gymshark made sales of £175.2 million with profit of £18.6 million. Around half of its turnover was generated in the USA. The company reported a 68% growth in sales in 2021 to £437.6 million, up from £260.7 million a year earlier.

Locations

Gymshark's head office is at Blythe Valley Park in Shirley, West Midlands. Based on the park is also GSIQ, the company's innovation centre and the Gymshark Lifting Club (GSLC)

Gymshark also has offices in London, Hong Kong, Mauritius and in 2019 the company opened its North American office in downtown Denver.

Gymshark opened its first store on Regent Street in London on 29th October 2022.

Products and marketing
Gymshark sells fitness apparel for men and women including workout vests, hoodies, t-shirts and leggings. While the brand was initially aimed at men, by 2020 approximately two thirds of sales were to women.

Gymshark was one of the first brands to make extensive use of influencer marketing by partnering with social media influencers, including YouTube body builders Nikki Blackketter and Lex Griffin. The company continues to market its product range through social media influencers. As of 2020, the company was paying 125 influencers to market the brand on social media.

Gymshark has over 5.5 million followers on Instagram.

The company does not rely substantially on brick-and-mortar stores, but did open its first pop-up shop in London's Covent Garden in February 2020. In 2022, Gymshark opened its first permanent store in Regent Street in London.

References

External links
 

2012 establishments in the United Kingdom
Clothing brands
Clothing brands of the United Kingdom
British brands
Sportswear brands
Clothing companies established in 2012
Sporting goods manufacturers of the United Kingdom